Alar Kivilo (born 17 February 1953 in Montréal, Canada) is a Canadian-Estonian cinematographer.

He is graduated from York University in Toronto, studying film speciality.

In 1997, he moved to USA.

He is an honorary member of Estonian Society of Cinematographers.

Awards:
 1995 Gemini Award nomination for "Heads"
 1997 Emmy Award nomination for "Gotti"

Filmography

References

External links
 

Living people
1953 births
Canadian cinematographers
Estonian cinematographers